Gianne Albertoni (born July 5, 1981) is a Brazilian actress and model.

Biography 

Albertoni was born in São Paulo, Brazil.  She was discovered 1993 when she was 13 years old, by a Brazilian multimedia artist and photographer, Sergio Valle Duarte. Four months later in Milan, she walked the runway for designers like Versace, Armani, Prada, Fiorucci.

In Milan, Albertoni worked for Dolce & Gabbana, Gucci, and Armani. In New York, she posed for photographers such as Bruce Weber, Mario Testino and Steven Meisel. She appeared in the Brazilian films "Popstar", "Muita Calma Nessa Hora","Malu de Bicicleta", "Carro de Paulista", and the Brazilian TV series "Mandrake" as Gigi.

Albertoni is a part of the series that is featured in the permanent collection of museums in Europe and South America. The series is denominated by the artist Sergio Valle Duarte as "Eletrografias e Fotografias com Fios de Cabelo para Futura Clonagem" BioArt. (Electrophotographs and Photographs with Human Hair for Future Cloning).

Since August 12, 2009, Albertoni co-hosted the Brazilian variety program Hoje em Dia on Rede Record.

References

External links

1981 births
Living people
Actresses from São Paulo
Brazilian people of Italian descent
Brazilian female models
Brazilian telenovela actresses
21st-century Brazilian women